Eugène "Gene" Rhéaume (December 3, 1932 – November 1, 2013) was a politician, insurance agent, and social worker from Northwest Territories, Canada.

Life 
Born in High Prairie, Alberta, he was the eighth of nine children. Their father was French-Canadian and their mother was of Scottish, Ojibwa, and Métis heritage. Rhéaume studied English at the University of Saskatchewan, obtaining a BA in 1953, and later received a social work degree after working in that field for a time. He married Helen Gessler in 1954. They had six children between 1955 and 1963. They were married 37 years, then, following a divorce, Rhéaume's partner for 15 years until his death was Margaret Jones of Okanagan Falls, British Columbia.

Rhéaume first ran for the House of Commons of Canada in the 1962 Canadian federal election against Isabel Hardie; he lost the hotly contested election by only 300 votes. He faced Hardie again just a year later in the 1963 Canadian federal election, this time defeating her.

Rhéaume served in the House of Commons for one term, before getting defeated himself in the 1965 Canadian federal election by Robert Orange. He was the PC candidate in the 1974 Canadian federal election running in the Saskatoon—Humboldt electoral district in Saskatchewan; he was defeated by incumbent Otto Lang.

Rhéaume died on November 1, 2013, from complications related to cancer surgery.

He was the grandfather of singer-songwriter Amanda Rheaume.

Electoral history

References

External links

1932 births
2013 deaths
Members of the House of Commons of Canada from the Northwest Territories
Progressive Conservative Party of Canada MPs
Métis politicians
Canadian Métis people
People from Big Lakes County
Indigenous Members of the House of Commons of Canada